Sugarmont is a streetcar stop in the Sugar House neighborhood of Salt Lake City, Utah, served by Utah Transit Authority's (UTA) S Line (previously known as the Sugar House Streetcar). The S Line provides service from Sugar House to the city of South Salt Lake (where it connects with UTA's TRAX light rail system).

Description 
The Sugarmont stop is located at 2215 South 900 East, just east of South 900 East on the north side of Sugarmont Drive. The side platform is located on the north side of the single set of tracks. There is very limited street-side parking possible nearby. The stop began service on December 8, 2013, and is operated by Utah Transit Authority.

References 

UTA streetcar stops
Railway stations in the United States opened in 2013
Railway stations in Salt Lake City
2013 establishments in Utah